Shinji Yamamoto may refer to:

 Shinji Turner-Yamamoto (born 1965), Japanese environmental artist
 Shinji Yamamoto (handballer) (born 1953), Japanese former handball player